Grey Abbey is a ruined Cistercian priory in Greyabbey, County Down, Northern Ireland. Currently maintained by the Northern Ireland Environment Agency, it is a monument in state care in the townland of Rosemount, on the eastern edge of the village of Greyabbey in the Ards and North Down local government district.

History
Grey Abbey was founded in 1193 by John de Courcy's wife, Affreca.

Gallery

References

1193 establishments in Europe
Archaeological sites in County Down
Buildings and structures in County Down
Burial sites of the Crovan dynasty
Christian monasteries established in the 12th century
Monasteries dissolved under the Irish Reformation
Cistercian monasteries in Northern Ireland
Civil parish of Greyabbey
Northern Ireland Environment Agency properties
Religion in County Down
Religious organizations established in the 1190s
Ruins in Northern Ireland
Tourist attractions in County Down
12th-century establishments in Ireland